Arthur Coville (born 4 February 1997) is a French rugby union player. His position is scrum-half and he currently plays for Stade Français in the Top 14.

Honours

International 
 France (U20)
Six Nations Under 20s Championship winners: 2018
World Rugby Under 20 Championship winners: 2018

References

External links
Stade Français profile
L'Équipe profile

1998 births
Living people
Sportspeople from Vannes
French rugby union players
Stade Français players
Rugby union scrum-halves